NurseTV (NTV) is an Internet television network and nationally syndicated television show devoted to nurses and the nursing profession in the United States.

External links

Access Nurses Launches NurseTV.com  AAACN Viewpoint,  Nov/Dec 2007

Internet properties established in 2008
Internet television channels
American medical websites
Nursing in the United States